Mürekkep (Ink) is the sixth studio album by Turkish singer Sıla. It was released on 6 May 2016 by Sony Music Entertainment and Columbia Records.

Release and content 
Sıla explained the preparation process of the album as follows: "We prepared a part of the album in our own studio and some parts of it in Athens. Some of them were prepared in the studio of Iskender Paydaş and some in the studio of Ozan Bayraşa. The studio phase was a long process. The writing stage of the songs had already begun when we released the album Yeni Ay. We like to spend more time in the studio as a team. Because different ideas and changes can arise. We don't leave the studio without sneaking out some new ideas. After completing everything and saying yes, we complete the studio phase."

The audio mixing of the songs was done by Arzu Alsan, Alp Turaç and Dimitris Mourras. Steve Fallone from Sterling Sound performed the audio mastering. The album's photographs were taken by Emre Ünal. Cengiz Abazoğlu prepared the singer's outfits for the photo shoot.

Music videos 
The album's first music video was made for the song "Afitap" and directed by Bedran Güzel. It was released on 29 April 2016.

Track listing

Personnel 

 Steve Fallone - mastering
 Efe Bahadır - acoustic guitar (tracks 1, 2, 3, 7, 8, 10), vocals (track 2), guitar (tracks 4, 6, 11), keyboards (track 4), electric guitar (track 5), percussion (track 10)
 Dünya Kızılçay - vocals (tracks 1, 2, 5, 6)
 Sibel Gürsoy - vocals (tracks 1, 2, 5, 6)
 Tûba Önal - vocals (track 1, 2, 5, 6)
 İskender Paydaş - drums (tracks 2, 11), keyboards (tracks 2, 11), percussions (tracks 2, 11)
 Caner Üstündağ - bass (tracks 2, 11)
 Mehmet Arif Cengiz - editing (tracks 2, 11), recording (tracks 2, 11)
 Saygın Özatmaca - editing (tracks 2, 11), recording (tracks 2, 11)
 Serkan Özyurt - editing (tracks 2, 11), recording (tracks 2, 11)
 Zafer Paydaş - editing (tracks 2, 11), recording (tracks 2, 11)
 Dimitris Mourlas - mixing (tracks 2, 11)
 Ozan Bayraşa - ukulele [bass] (tracks 3, 9), acoustic guitar (track 9)
 Alpdoğan Türeci - drums (tracks 3, 4, 6, 7, 8, 10)
 Arzu Alsan - mixing (tracks 3, 4, 6, 7, 8, 9), recording (tracks 4, 5, 6, 7, 8, 10), editing (tracks 5, 6, 7, 8, 10)
 Emre Kıral - mixing (track 3)
 Yasemin Özler - strings (track 3)
 Çağlar Haznedaroğlu - strings (track 3)
 Alp Ersönmez - bass (tracks 4, 8, 9)
 Batu Şallıel - brass (tracks 4, 6, 8, 12)
 Göksun Çavdar - brass (tracks 4, 6, 8, 12)
 Hasan Gözetlik - brass (tracks 4, 6, 8, 12)
 Cengiz Ercümer - percussion (tracks 4, 5, 6, 7), cajón (track 10), shaker (track 10)
 Fatih Ahıskalı - acoustic guitar (track 5), oud (tracks 5, 8, 10, 11), cümbüş (tracks 5, 10), guitar (track 6)
 Eralp Görgün - bass (track 5)
 Bülent Altınbaş - clarinet (track 5)
 Hasan Umut Önder - editing (track 5), recording (track 5), mixing (track 5)
 Turgut Özüfler - kanun (tracks 5, 7)
 Kempa Yaylı Grubu - strings (track 5)
 İlyas Tetik - violin (track 5)
 Cudi Genç - bass (tracks 6, 7, 10)
 Semih Çelikel - violin (tracks 6, 10)
 Özer Arkun - cello (track 7)
 Burak Erkul - electric piano (track 7), piano (track 8), keyboards (tracks 8, 10)
 Kaan Ahıskalı - percussion (track 7)
 Mustafa İpekçioğlu - bağlama (track 8)
 Sertaç Çevikkol - bassoon (track 9)
 Serdar Barçın - flute (track 9)
 Türker Çolak - percussion (track 9)
 Alp Turaç - mixing (track 10)
 Gündem Yaylı Grubu - strings (track 11)
 Bedük - guitar (track 12), mixing (track 12)
 Emre Ünal - photography
 Melek Boçoğlu - cover design

Charts

Sales

Release history

References 

2016 albums
Sıla Gençoğlu albums
Sony Music albums
Columbia Records albums
Turkish-language albums